Mellwood is an unincorporated community and census-designated place (CDP) in Phillips County, Arkansas, United States. Mellwood has a post office with ZIP code 72367. It was first listed as a CDP in the 2020 census with a population of 21.

The lynching of Owen Flemming occurred near Mellwood on June 8, 1927.

Demographics

2020 census

Note: the US Census treats Hispanic/Latino as an ethnic category. This table excludes Latinos from the racial categories and assigns them to a separate category. Hispanics/Latinos can be of any race.

References

Unincorporated communities in Phillips County, Arkansas
Unincorporated communities in Arkansas
Census-designated places in Arkansas
Census-designated places in Phillips County, Arkansas